Michael Kawooya (born 20 January 1984 in Mengo) is a Ugandan professional squash player. He has represented Uganda at the Commonwealth Games in 2010, 2014, 2018 and 2022.

References

1984 births
Living people
Ugandan male squash players
Squash players at the 2010 Commonwealth Games
Squash players at the 2014 Commonwealth Games
Squash players at the 2018 Commonwealth Games
Commonwealth Games competitors for Uganda